KMPH-TV (channel 26) is a television station licensed to Visalia, California, United States, serving the Fresno area as an affiliate of the Fox network. It is owned by Sinclair Broadcast Group alongside Sanger-licensed CW affiliate KFRE-TV (channel 59). Both stations share studios on McKinley Avenue in eastern Fresno, while KMPH-TV's transmitter is located on Big Baldy Mountain in northwestern Tulare County.

The station's signal is relayed to the northern part of the market on low-power Class A translator KMPH-CD (originally KMPH-LD from 2007 to 2011), channel 17, licensed to Merced and Mariposa, with transmitter on Mount Bullion. Unlike its parent station, the translator does not broadcast in high definition.

History

Early years
The station first signed on the air on October 11, 1971; originally operating as an independent station (though it ran ABC, NBC, and CBS shows that the local affiliates passed on at times as well), it was the first television station founded by the Pappas brothers, Mike, Pete and Harry, through their company, Pappas Television. The brothers already owned radio stations KGEN (1370 AM) and KBOS (94.9 FM) in Tulare, KMPH's original city of license. The station's original studios were located on Mooney Boulevard in Visalia. The funding for KMPH came from general manager Harry Pappas' plan of having hundreds of investors each investing a small amount of money that was needed to construct the station, rather than having one investor providing all the capital; as a result, the Pappas brothers had a combined ownership stake of only 30.5%, with the other 69.5% controlled by other investors.

KMPH carried Operation Prime Time programming at least in 1978. That year, Harry Pappas formed a new company, Pappas Telecasting, to buy full control of the station for $3.1 million. In 1979, KMPH changed its city of license from Tulare to Visalia.  That same year, the station began producing tape delay broadcasts of Fresno State Bulldogs football  1984's NCAA v. Board of Regents of the University of Oklahoma decision that brought more freedom for teams to have their games on TV, brought about a handful of road games being telecast live.  In 1986, live home games were added to the schedule.

Soon after signing on, KMPH had passed KAIL (then on channel 53, now on channel 7) as the leading independent in the Central Valley. KAIL went dark in 1973 but returned to the air in 1976 as a very low budget operation initially running mostly religion but would gradually build into a major player. Throughout the early to mid-1980s, KMPH was one of the top independent stations in the country.

Since 1988
Pappas signed an affiliation deal with Fox for KMPH to become an affiliate of the network in 1988; the agreement also covered sister stations WHNS in Greenville, South Carolina and KPTM in Omaha, Nebraska. At the time, Fresno and Omaha were the only two top-100 markets without a Fox affiliate. KMPH remains a Fox affiliate to this day; both it and NBC affiliate KSEE (channel 24) were the only two stations in Fresno that were unaffected by the 1985 network swap involving ABC and CBS between KFSN-TV (channel 30) and KJEO (channel 47, now KGPE) and the later launches of The CW and MyNetworkTV in September 2006. The station relocated its operations from its original studio in Visalia to its current facility on McKinley Avenue in Fresno in the early 1990s.

Ownership change
On May 10, 2008, thirteen Pappas stations, including KMPH, filed for Chapter 11 bankruptcy protection. As a result of the bankruptcy, Pappas Telecasting Companies was given until February 15, 2009 to sell these stations to other owners. On January 16, 2009, Pappas announced that most of the stations, including KMPH, would be purchased by New World TV Group (no relation to the similarly named New World Communications, which switched most of its stations to Fox between September 1994 and July 1995), after the sale received United States bankruptcy court approval. On April 2, 2009, Pappas laid off 22 employees involved with the KMPH/KFRE duopoly. New World TV Group formed a new holding company known as the Titan TV Broadcast Group (unrelated to the similarly named smaller-market radio station owner Titan Broadcasting), which completed its purchase of most of the Pappas stations involved in the bankruptcy on October 15, 2009.

Titan announced the sale of KMPH-TV, KFRE-TV and most of the company's other stations to the Sinclair Broadcast Group on June 3, 2013. The FCC approved the sale on September 19, and the sale was officially finalized on October 3, 2013. With the completion of the sale, KMPH was reunited with Bakersfield Fox affiliate, KBFX-CD, which formerly operated as a repeater of KMPH, but was sold by Pappas in 2005 and had been acquired by Sinclair as part of its merger with Fisher Communications earlier in 2013.

Programming
In 2003, KMPH stopped carrying Fox's children's program block 4Kids TV; the block, which normally aired on Saturdays, was moved to sister station KFRE-TV and aired on that station on a tape delay on Sunday mornings (this resulted in KFRE carrying children's blocks from two major networks, as it already carried The WB's Kids' WB block). KMPH was one of the few Fox charter affiliates to have dropped the network's children's programming; beginning in the mid-1990s, Fox gave its affiliates (after several stations that switched to the network between 1994 and 1995 that were owned by New World Communications opted not to carry the lineup) the option to pre-empt Fox Kids programming and arrange for another local station to carry the block, a practice continued until the end of the 4Kids TV's run. KFRE continued to carry 4Kids TV until the block was discontinued by Fox on December 28, 2008 due to a dispute with the block's lessee 4Kids Entertainment; KMPH has also declined to carry Fox's Saturday morning infomercial block Weekend Marketplace, which instead airs on KFRE in 4Kids TV's former Sunday morning timeslot on the station.

News operation
KMPH-TV presently broadcasts 34½ hours of locally produced newscasts each week (with 6½ hours each weekday and one hour each on Saturdays and Sundays); in addition, the station produces the lifestyle program Around the Valley, which airs weekdays at 11:00 a.m. prior to its midday newscast.

In 1978, KMPH launched its news department and began producing a nightly primetime newscast Monday through Friday; The 10 O'Clock News. Originally the station sourced its national news from the ITN Satellite News Service and API Wire Services to augment its own local news coverage, primarily split between the cities of Visalia and Fresno and the surrounding communities. In late 1979, KMPH launched a short-lived midday newscast, The Midday Edition, which was cancelled after nine months. Later, in the early 1980s, the station's newscast was expanded to Saturdays. In early 1982, KMPH, launched a weekly newsmagazine show, The Sunday Edition, which occupied the 10 p.m. timeslot on Sunday nights; it was cancelled a year later. The 10 O'Clock News went on to become the longest-running primetime newscast in the Fresno market. On October 6, 2003, KMPH debuted a three-hour weekday morning newscast, titled Great Day; that same date, the station also launched a half-hour midday newscast at 11:30 a.m. In the spring of 2007, Great Day was expanded to five hours, running from 5-10 a.m.

In January 2006, KMPH began to produce a half-hour 11:00 p.m. newscast for sister station KFRE-TV; the newscast was unable to compete against the established late evening newscasts on KFSN-TV, KSEE and KGPE and was canceled the following year in February 2007, due to low ratings. On September 30, 2009, KMPH-TV became the second television station in the Fresno market (after KFSN, which made the upgrade in April 2007) to begin broadcasting its local newscasts in high definition. It was the first television station in the market to provide news video from the field in true high definition, as KMPH upgraded its ENG vehicles, satellite truck, studio and field cameras and other equipment in order to broadcast news footage from the field in high definition, in addition to segments broadcast from the main studio.

KMPH has produced newscasts for KPTM in Omaha, Nebraska since the early 2010s, interspersing live reporters from the Omaha market with studio anchors in Fresno.

In July 2014, Politifact reported that KMPH, in a news story, claimed that the implementation of the Patient Protection and Affordable Care Act had increased the average emergency room wait time in California to five hours. Its reporting was deemed inaccurate, as it was based on statistics released by the California HealthCare Foundation in 2012, and not from after the implementation of the Affordable Care Act.

Notable current on-air staff
 Kopi Sotiropulos – anchor

Notable former on-air staff
 Vic "The Brick" Jacobs – sportscaster (now at KLAC radio in Los Angeles)
 Lloyd Lindsay Young – weathercaster (later at WWOR-TV in Secaucus, New Jersey)

Technical information

KMPH-TV subchannels
The station's digital signal is multiplexed:

KMPH-CD subchannel

In October 2009, KMPH began carrying This TV on digital subchannel 26.2. On October 31, 2015, Comet began airing on 26.3.

On October 1, 2019, KMPH-DT2 became an affiliate of Dabl, replacing This TV.

Analog-to-digital conversion
KMPH-TV shut down its analog signal, over UHF channel 26, on June 12, 2009, the official date in which full-power television in the United States transitioned from analog to digital broadcasts under federal mandate. The station's digital signal remained on its pre-transition UHF channel 28. Through the use of PSIP, digital television receivers display the station's virtual channel as its former UHF analog channel 26.

Out of market coverage 
KMPH-TV's focus is on the San Joaquin Valley and Central California. The station's signal is receivable as far way as the Bakersfield area; however, local Fox affiliate and sister station KBFX-CD (itself once a KMPH repeater) is the only Fox station carried by cable providers in the Bakersfield market. Through its translator, KMPH-TV's signal extends northward to Merced, Mariposa and the southern Sierra Nevada, and sometimes can be received in Monterey County for those who live just north of King City. KMPH-TV has been received over the air sometimes in eastern Kern County (Ridgecrest) and San Luis Obispo.

References

External links

Fox network affiliates
Dabl affiliates
Comet (TV network) affiliates
MPH-TV
Sinclair Broadcast Group
Pappas Telecasting
Television channels and stations established in 1971
1971 establishments in California
Companies that filed for Chapter 11 bankruptcy in 2008